Valley Forge is a 1975 videotaped adaptation of the 1934 Broadway play by Maxwell Anderson. Directed and produced by Fielder Cook. Originally broadcast as part of the Hallmark Hall of Fame series of specials.

Plot
The film concerns the American Revolutionary War encampment at Valley Forge, Pennsylvania and a planned escape by the men desperate to leave behind the terrible conditions of the winter.

Cast
 Richard Basehart as General George Washington
 Harry Andrews as General William Howe
 Simon Ward as Major John André
 Victor Garber as General Lafayette
 Christopher Walken as The Hessian
 Edward Herrmann as Congressman Folsom
 Nancy Marchand as Annie
 John Heard as Mr. Harvie
 Woodrow Parfrey as Minto
 Lane Smith as Spad
 Josef Sommer as Brig. Gen. 'Dusty' Varnum

Production

Writing
To condense the plot, the seventy-five-minute production entirely omits the play's principal female character, Mary Philipse.

Filming
Shot partly on location in Canada.

See also
 List of American films of 1975

External links

1975 films
Films directed by Fielder Cook
1970s war drama films
American war drama films
Valley Forge
American Revolutionary War films
Cultural depictions of Gilbert du Motier, Marquis de Lafayette
Cultural depictions of George Washington
1975 drama films
1970s American films